Nebulosa inaequiplaga is a moth of the family Notodontidae. It is found in western Colombia.

References

Moths described in 1911
Notodontidae of South America